The Southwestern Alabama Railway was incorporated in Alabama, United States, in 1897 and tasked with construction of a branch line from a connection with the Alabama Midland Railway near Newton, Alabama towards Elba, Alabama. The route was completed to Elba in October 1898, totaled , and was operated by the Alabama Midland Railway.

As surveyed the original route was to terminate at Elba, with a depot constructed in the city proper. However, as built the railroad instead ended approximately one mile south of the city limits, briefly creating conflict with businessmen and other sponsors of the new route who resided in Elba proper. Within a few years of the new railroad construction Elba's industrial district was located around the railroad wye south of town.

The entirety of the Elba branch was operated until 1984 when the tracks between Clintonville and Elba were abandoned. Today, the remainder of the original route from Waterford to Enterprise is operated by the Wiregrass Central Railroad, a short line.

Defunct Alabama railroads
Predecessors of the Atlantic Coast Line Railroad
Railway companies established in 1897
Railway companies disestablished in 1898